Pat Boone's Golden Hits Featuring Speedy Gonzales is a compilation album by Pat Boone, released in 1962 on Dot Records.

Track listing

References 

1962 compilation albums
Pat Boone albums
Dot Records compilation albums